Dobos torte, also known as Dobosh, is a Hungarian sponge cake layered with chocolate buttercream and topped with caramel.  The layered pastry is named after its inventor, Hungarian chef József C. Dobos, a delicatessen owner in Budapest. In the late 1800s, he decided to create a cake that would last longer than other pastries in an age when cooling techniques were limited. The round sides of the cake are coated with ground hazelnuts, chestnuts, walnuts, or almonds, and the hardened caramel top helps to prevent drying out, for a longer shelf life.

History 

Dobos torte was introduced at the National General Exhibition of Budapest in 1885; Emperor Franz Joseph I and Empress Elisabeth were among the first to taste it. The cake became popular throughout Europe, both for its durability through shipping and for its unique appearance. With its flat, shiny, caramel glazed top, it was simple but elegant, as opposed to the more intricate cakes of the age. Its use of fine chocolate buttercream was very little known at the time because cake fillings and frostings were usually made with cooked pastry cream or whipped cream. Dobos had discovered buttercream while traveling in France, but he invented the batter of the cake.   

The cream incorporated cocoa butter for extra smoothness.  During his lifetime, the cake was often imitated, but never reproduced. Dobos traveled to other countries in Europe to introduce his cake, and soon began exporting the product in specially designed wooden boxes. Near the end of his career, in 1906, Dobos donated his recipe to the Pastry and Honey-Makers' Guild.

See also 
 Doberge cake – a layered dessert originating in New Orleans, Louisiana, adapted from the Dobos torte
 Prinzregententorte – a Bavarian torte consisting of, usually seven, thin layers of sponge cake interlaid with chocolate buttercream
 Rigo Jancsi – a traditional Hungarian cube-shaped, layered, chocolate sponge cake and chocolate cream pastry
 Smith Island cake – similar to the Prinzregententorte, with 8 to 15 thin layers filled with creme, frosting and/or crushed candy bars, and iced with a cooked chocolate icing
 Spekkoek – a type of Indonesian layer cake which commonly has more than 18 layers and contains a mix of Indonesian spices
 Stack cake – an Appalachian cake made of many layers that is filled and frosted with applesauce made from dried apples or cooked down fruit butters

References

External links 
 

Hungarian words and phrases
Hungarian desserts
Chocolate desserts
Nut dishes
1885 introductions
Layer cakes
Sponge cakes